The 2008–09 San Diego State men's basketball team represented San Diego State University in the 2008–09 college basketball season. This was head coach Steve Fisher's tenth season at San Diego State. The Aztecs competed in the Mountain West Conference and played their home games at the Viejas Arena.

Schedule and results
Source
All times are Pacific

|-
!colspan=9| Exhibition

|-
!colspan=9| Regular Season

|-
!colspan=10| 2009 Mountain West Conference men's basketball tournament

|-
!colspan=10| 2009 National Invitation Tournament

References

San Diego State
San Diego State
San Diego State Aztecs men's basketball seasons